Shaquille Olajuwon Mason (born August 28, 1993) is an American football offensive guard for the Houston Texans of the National Football League (NFL). Mason played college football at Georgia Tech from 2011 to 2014 and was drafted by the New England Patriots in the fourth round of the 2015 NFL Draft.

College career
 
Mason played 11 games as a true freshman in 2011. From 2012 to 2014, he started in 39 of the Yellow Jackets' 41 games, including every game as a junior and senior. Mason was first-team All- ACC in 2013 and 2014 as well as first-team All American in 2014.

Professional career

New England Patriots
On May 2, 2015, Mason was selected in the fourth round (131st overall) by the New England Patriots. Mason appeared in 14 games with 10 starts for the Patriots as a rookie.

Mason broke his hand during the 2016 preseason and did not start in the season opener against the Cardinals but split time at right guard with rookie Ted Karras. Since then, he started every game at right guard for the Patriots.

On February 5, 2017, Mason was part of the Patriots team that won Super Bowl LI. In the game, the Patriots defeated the Atlanta Falcons by a score of 34–28 in overtime.

In 2017, Mason started all 16 games at right guard for the Patriots. He started in Super Bowl LII, but gave up the strip sack that ultimately proved to be the biggest play of the game. The Patriots lost 41-33 to the Philadelphia Eagles.

On August 27, 2018, Mason signed a five-year, $50 million contract extension with the Patriots. He started 14 games at right guard in 2018, missing two with a calf injury. He was given a grade of 82.1 by Pro Football Focus in the regular season, the highest grade of any guard in the league. Mason played every offensive snap in Super Bowl LIII and the Patriots defeated the Los Angeles Rams 13-3.

Mason was placed on the reserve/COVID-19 list by the Patriots on October 17, 2020, and activated on October 21.

Tampa Bay Buccaneers
On March 15, 2022, Mason was traded to the Tampa Bay Buccaneers in exchange for a fifth round pick in the 2022 NFL Draft. The trade reunited him with star quarterback Tom Brady.

Houston Texans 
On March 15, 2023, Mason and a 2023 seventh-round pick were traded to the Houston Texans in exchange for a 6th-round pick in the 2023 NFL Draft.

External links 
 Georgia Tech profile
 New England Patriots bio

References

1993 births
Living people
American football offensive guards
American football centers
Georgia Tech Yellow Jackets football players
Houston Texans players
New England Patriots players
People from Columbia, Tennessee
Players of American football from Tennessee
Tampa Bay Buccaneers players